Radio DeeJay is an Italian radio station. It was founded on 1 February 1982 by the Italian radio and television personality Claudio Cecchetto and was acquired by the Gruppo Editoriale L'Espresso in 1989. In 2020 EXOR (of the Agnelli-family) became the owner of GEDI (Gruppo Editoriale L’Espresso); and owns Radio DeeJay.

TV channel 

From the end of 2000, on the satellite platform began broadcasting DeeJay TV.

The TV channel, under the artistic guidance of Linus, was visible from all over Europe until 2003, the year in which the issuer becomes part of the Sky package and coding their own programs.
In October 2009, the channel broadcasts in plain-text, replacing the All Music channel on its frequency. On the Sky platform, the MyDeejay channel is broadcast instead.

Overview
Early personalities on this radio station include: Claudio Cecchetto, Gerry Scotti, Molella, Fargetta, Lorenzo Cherubini a.k.a. (Jovanotti), Roberto Ferrari, Linus, Albertino, Marco Biondi, Amadeus, Rosario Fiorello and Valerio Gallorini.

Broadcast FTA on Hotbird, on SKY Italia channel 700 and on Alice Home TV channel 774.

See also 
Valerio Gallorini
Kataweb
Carlo De Benedetti

References

External links
  Radio DeeJay Official Website
  Radio DeeJay on YouTube

Free-to-air
Mass media in Milan
Radio stations in Italy
Radio stations established in 1982
GEDI Gruppo Editoriale
1982 establishments in Italy